The Unauthorized Biography of Reinhold Messner is the third studio album by Ben Folds Five, released April 27, 1999. It represented a departure for the band from their usual pop-rock sound to material influenced by classical and chamber music, with darker, introspective lyrics on subjects such as regret, death, and loss of innocence. It was the final full-length album from the trio until the release of The Sound of the Life of the Mind in 2012. It was produced by Caleb Southern.

Background

Title origin 
The title of the album refers to a name used by the band's drummer Darren Jessee and his friends on fake IDs as teenagers. The band was unaware of the existence of the real Reinhold Messner, the first man to climb Mount Everest solo, and the first to do so without the aid of bottled oxygen, until work on the album had already progressed. They were informed of his existence in 1999 during an interview with DJ Bruce Warren of WXPN radio. In the record's liner notes, Messner is thanked for his understanding and cooperation.

Writing and recording 
The writing style of the album has been described by the band as a reactionary process, a result of the fatigue from playing in a bombastic rock band. Bassist Robert Sledge stated in an interview with Front to Back that this fatigue naturally led to the band playing lighter material.

Lead singer and songwriter Ben Folds recalls being "tired of writing pop songs" and it led to changes in his writing style. As the new material was being written, Folds was "really into" chord progressions and voice leadings that he says kept finding their way into what he was writing. Naturally, the original demo for the album did not have traditional songs, but rather was one long track containing all the musical ideas as a cohesive narrative. After some concerns from the label, Folds says, "everyone took me out to lunch and asked me to split it up into separate songs instead of being one, and I remember Caleb saying – kind of implying that we were sort of in trouble pretty soon because nobody was hearing anything that sounded like real songs on the record."

The album was recorded in a three-month span. Unlike its predecessor, Whatever and Ever Amen, which was recorded at Folds's house in Chapel Hill, Reinhold Messner was recorded at several recording studios. It features a notable amount of overdubs such as a heavy use of string sections, french horns, and a prominent horn section in the lead single "Army".

Songs
Both critics and the band members themselves have described The Unauthorized Biography of Reinhold Messner to be a loose concept album, following the Reinhold Messner character through his life, heartache, hospitalization, and childhood memories.

During the WASO Live in Perth concert, Folds describes the song "Narcolepsy" as "about going to sleep, but it's the about the kind of going to sleep that you can't help. I always related it to – there's a kind of narcolepsy where you're overstimulated in any kind of way, if you get really happy or excited or sad or whatever, you just go right to sleep; I realized that there's lots of guys out there that do this emotionally, including myself."

Originally, "Don't Change Your Plans" was preceded by a long instrumental passage; Folds credits Southern for helping edit down the song to its final product, and told an interviewer that Southern, "just cut it away and then all of a sudden it was this pop song. And then it was like ‘Oh okay. I see what you’re talking about.’ Cause I didn't hear it like that at all. I just heard it as this little masterpiece thing.” In a Reddit AMA, Folds claims Southern "cut the parts he didn't like and literally left the unwanted bits on the floor. I imagine the floor was cleaned and the recording went into the trash."

On the Ben Folds iTunes Originals, Folds explains that the song "Mess" is a "loss of innocence song" about having so much baggage that now you are unable to completely explain your history; "you've made a mess."

The hospital referred to in "Hospital Song" is a real hospital: Forsyth Medical Center, located on Silas Creek Parkway in Winston-Salem, North Carolina.

The vocal portion of "Your Most Valuable Possession" consists of a message left on Folds' answering machine by his father, Dean Folds, while he was partially asleep.

Outtakes
The band recorded the songs "Leather Jacket" (written by Jessee) and "Birds" (an instrumental written by Sledge) during the Reinhold Messner sessions; the songs were not included on the album, but were released as b-sides on the "Army" and "Don't Change Your Plans" singles. "Leather Jacket" would also later appear on the charity compilation No Boundaries: A Benefit for the Kosovar Refugees.

At least two songs, "Break Up at Food Court" and "Carrying Cathy", were played during these sessions, but were neither released nor played live by the band. Folds would later officially record "Carrying Cathy" for his debut solo release, Rockin' the Suburbs. A demo for "Break Up at Food Court" was also later released in 2011, on "The Best Imitation of Myself: A Retrospective".

Reception

The record was given generally positive reviews, with Allmusic saying that it's the band's willingness "to forge a unique sound that makes The Unauthorized Biography of Reinhold Messner such an interesting album to listen to. There is care to these songs and, what's even more significant and fresh, there is also intelligence." Robert Christgau gave the album a B in his Consumer Guide.

Legacy 
Folds stated in the iTunes Originals interview about the album: "The 'Reinhold Messner' record was – I think in a way it shows how naïve we were, and idealistic we were as a band to think the music business would care about us extending ourselves and developing and being something different, because that record was a failure – in almost every way that you can fail. As a commercial release, it didn't sell up to anybody’s expectations; critically, it got sort of lukewarm reviews; and yet, I think that was our best work. I think it's a great record."

Speaking in 2005, six years after its release, Folds partially attributed the album to the initial break-up of Ben Folds Five, stating: "We were having a really hard time before we split, the Reinhold Messner period was financially and career-wise a disaster."

The band reunited to play the album in its entirety at the UNC Memorial Hall in Chapel Hill, North Carolina on September 18, 2008.  This one-off concert appearance was part of the MySpace "Front to Back" series, in which artists play an entire album live. The band were briefly joined on stage by Ben's father, Dean Folds, who read a transcript of his voice mail message that is used in the album song "Your Most Valuable Possession".

In 2017, the album was reissued on a 180-gram vinyl. The reissue was sourced from the original mix reels and sported a new master by Kevin Gray.

The lead single, "Army", was featured in the Viceland comedy series Nirvanna the Band the Show as the end credits theme song.

Track listing
All tracks written by Ben Folds, except where noted.

Australian release
 "Theme from 'Dr. Pyser' (bonus track)
Japanese release
 "Birds" (bonus track)

Personnel
Ben Folds Five
Ben Folds - vocals, piano and keyboards
Robert Sledge - electric bass, synthesizer, double bass and background vocals
Darren Jessee - drums, percussion and background vocals

Additional personnel
Antoine Silverman - violin on 1, 2, 3, 4, 9, 11
Mark Feldman - violin on 1, 2, 3, 4, 9, 11
Lorenza Ponce - violin on 1, 2, 3, 4, 9, 11
Jane Scarpantoni - cello on 1, 2, 3, 4, 9, 11
Ken Mosher - alto saxophone, baritone saxophone on 6, 11
Tom Maxwell - tenor saxophone on 6, 11
Paul Shapiro - tenor saxophone on 6
Frank London - trumpet on 6
John Mark Painter - flugelhorn on 1, 2, 6, valve trombone on 6
Dean Folds - answering machine message on "Your Most Valuable Possession"

Production
Producer: Caleb Southern
Mixing: Andy Wallace
Additional Editing: Roger Lian

Charts
Album - Billboard (United States)

Singles - Billboard (United States)

References

Ben Folds Five albums
1999 albums
Albums produced by Caleb Southern